Jacques Robert (1890–1928) was a Swiss silent actor and film director in the 1910s and 1920s.

Early life
Jacques Robert was born in 1890.

Career
Robert started his career as a silent actor by acting in the Count of Monte Cristo film serials directed by Henri Pouctal in the 1910s. He went on to act in films by pioneer directors like Charles Burguet, Gérard Bourgeois, Henri Pouctal, René Leprince, and Léon Poirier, up until 1921. He went on to direct six silent films.

Death
He died on 15 January 1928 in France.

Filmography

As an actor
La course du flambeau (dir. Charles Burguet, 1918).
L'âme de Pierre (dir. Charles Burguet, 1918).
Le fils de la nuit (dir. Gérard Bourgeois, 1919).
Travail (dir. Henri Pouctal, 1920).
La force de la vie (dir. René Leprince, 1920).
Narayana (dir. Léon Poirier, 1920).
L'essor (dir. Charles Burguet, 1921).
L'ombre déchirée (dir. Léon Poirier, 1921).

As a director
La vivante épingle (1921).
La bouquetière des innocents (1923).
Le cousin Pons (1924).
 Count Kostia (1925).
La chèvre aux pieds d'or (1926).
En plongée (1926).

References

External links

1890 births
1928 deaths
Swiss male silent film actors
Swiss film directors
Silent film directors